The Council of State (Norwegian: Statsrådet), is a formal body composed of the most senior government ministers chosen by the Prime Minister, and functions as the collective decision-making organ constituting the executive branch of the Kingdom. The council simultaneously plays the role of privy council as well as government Cabinet. 

With the exception of the Prime Minister and the Minister of Foreign Affairs, who retain their ministerial ranking in their own right, all the other members of the Cabinet concurrently hold the position of statsråd, meaning Councillor of State, and that of Chief of the various departments, not formally being considered 'ministers', although commonly addressed as such. The Cabinet normally convenes every week, usually on Fridays at 11:00 a.m. at the Royal Palace, Oslo, and is presided over by the Monarch.

Constitutional basis 
Under the 1814 Constitution of Norway, the third-oldest national Constitution still in operation (after the constitution of San Marino and US Constitution), the King is the head of the executive branch of Norway. However, historical developments such as the introduction of parliamentarism in 1884 and evolving constitutional tradition have altered the King's role, meaning that the Prime Minister, holding the leadership of a political party enjoying electoral support, is the de facto head of government. Accordingly, when Article 3 of the Constitution reads, "The Executive Power is vested in the King", this nowadays reflects the powers conferred on the elected government, operating through the Council of State and headed by the Prime Minister.

The parliamentary system of Norway entails that the Cabinet must not have Parliament against it, and that the appointment by the King is a formality. The members making up the Council of State require the confidence of the Norwegian legislative body, known as the Storting. In practice, the monarch will ask the leader of a parliamentary block that has a majority in the Storting to form a government. After elections resulting in no clear majority to any party or coalition, the leader of the party most likely to be able to form a government is appointed Prime Minister. 

The fact that the original wording of the Constitution has not been modified to reflect contemporary practice, is a testimony to the widespread conservative sentiments shared across the political aisle that extensive constitutional revision should be avoided. In practice, this means that the function, authority and mandate of the Council of State is heavily influenced by long-standing conventions.

The Council of State is established by the following article of the Constitution, stating that

Functions and mandate 

The Council of State convenes to formally make decisions on matters of State, passing so-called Royal Resolutions (Norwegian: Kongelige resolusjoner) or Orders in Council. Theoretically, the Royal Resolutions themselves are the King's decisions, but are practically those of the government. However, they require the contra-signature of the Prime Minister, or, in cases relating to military command, of the Minister of Defence in order to be valid. Later, entire records from the proceedings of the Council of State is signed by all its members. This is done in order to remove all personal responsibility on part of the King, in keeping with Article 5 of the Constitution, which states that, "The King's person is sacred; he cannot be censured or accused. The responsibility rests with his Council". Another feature of this system is that the King, when having sanctioned a decision, is referred to as King-in-Council (Norwegian: Kongen i statsråd), meaning the King as well as his council.

According to the Constitution, certain cases, such as appointments and dismissals of higher office, pardons, provisional measures, church ordinances and ratifications of treaties must be administered by the Council of State. Whilst not prescribed in the Constitution, the signing of bills and other regulations into law is the most important feature of the work being conducted during sessions of the Council of State.

Duty of remonstrance 
Article 30 of the Norwegian Constitution states that any member of the Council of State, if he or she is of the opinion that the "King's decision conflicts with the form of government or the laws of the Realm" is bound by a "duty to make strong remonstrances against it, as well as to enter his opinion in the records." The Article continues by stating that a Member who has not voiced such objections is liable of impeachment by the Storting should a decision made in the Council of State later be found unlawful. For the same reason, the aforesaid Article prescribes that all of the decisions made in the Council of State shall be put down in official records.

Requirements of membership 
Whilst most members of the Cabinet originate from within the Storting and will have their seats deputised during their time in office, being Member of Parliament is not a requirement. However, since the introduction of parliamentarism in 1884, all members of the Cabinet must have the express support of the legislature. In addition, they must hold Norwegian citizenship and be eligible to vote, meaning that they have attained the age of 18.  Until a 2012 amendment, there was a requirement that a majority of the members had to be affiliated with the Church of Norway, the national state church. When church matters are on the table, all members of the Cabinet not registered with the Church would not be in attendance.

Order of precedence and succession 
There is no official order of succession to the premiership of Norway, but the Minister of Foreign Affairs has traditionally been regarded as akin to Deputy Prime Minister, although no such title officially exists. The King established on 1 July 1993 an Order of precedence to direct seating and ranking on formal occasions. Here, the Minister of Finance enjoys the foremost rank after the Prime Minister, with the Minister of Foreign Affairs only coming in third, behind the minister of Agriculture and Food.

Current composition

External links
Article in a Norwegian online encyclopedia (Norwegian)
Information from the official web site of the Norwegian monarchy
Official web portal of the Norwegian government

Government of Norway
Norway